Wayne DeSutter (born May 17, 1944) is a former American football tackle. He played for the Buffalo Bills in 1966.

References

1944 births
Living people
American football tackles
Illinois Fighting Illini football players
Western Illinois Leathernecks football players
Buffalo Bills players